The governor of Victoria is the representative of the monarch, currently King Charles III, in the Australian state of Victoria. The governor is one of seven viceregal representatives in the country, analogous to the governors of the other states and the governor-general federally.

The governor is appointed by the monarch on the advice of the premier of Victoria. The governor's role is to represent the Crown in right of Victoria. This role mainly includes performing ceremonial functions, such as opening and dissolving parliament, appointing the cabinet and granting royal assent.

The governor's office and official residence is Government House next to the Royal Botanic Gardens and surrounded by Kings Domain in Melbourne.

The current governor of Victoria is Linda Dessau, Victoria's first female governor.

Powers
In accordance with the conventions of the Westminster system of parliamentary government, the governor nearly always acts solely on the advice of the head of the elected government, the premier of Victoria. Nevertheless, the governor retains the reserve powers of the Crown, and has the right to dismiss the premier.

Role of governor
The governor is appointed by the Monarch of Australia, on the advice of the premier of Victoria, to act as the monarch's representative as head of state in Victoria. The governor acts "At His Majesty's pleasure", meaning that the term of the governor can be terminated at any time by the monarch acting upon the advice of the premier.

Since the Australia Acts of 1986, it is the governor and not the monarch who exercises all the powers of the head of state and the governor is not subject to the direction or supervision of the monarch but acts upon the advice of the premier. Upon appointment, the governor becomes a viceroy. The governor's main responsibilities fall into three categories – constitutional, ceremonial and community engagement.

Governor's personal standard
The personal standard of the governor of Victoria is the same design as the state flag of Victoria, but with the blue background replaced by gold, and red stars depicting the Southern Cross. Above the Southern Cross is the Royal Crown.

The current standard has been in place since 1984. Previously, the standard used by Victorian governors after 1870 had been the Union Jack with the Badge of the State of Victoria emblazoned in the centre. From 1903 to 1953, the Tudor Crown was used on the state flag and governor's standard and this was changed to the present crown in 1954.

The governor's standard is flown at Government House and on vehicles conveying the governor. The standard is lowered over Government House when the governor is absent from Victoria.

Past and present standards of the governor

Related offices
There is also a lieutenant-governor and an administrator. The chief justice of Victoria is ex officio the administrator, unless the chief justice is the lieutenant-governor, in which case, the next most senior judge is the administrator. The lieutenant-governor takes on the responsibilities of the governor when that post is vacant or when the governor is out of the state or unable to act. The administrator takes on those duties if both the governor and lieutenant-governor are not able to act for the above reasons.

See Governors of the Australian states for a description and history of the office of governor.

The Official Secretary to the Governor of Victoria is the head of the Office of the Governor which supports the Governor of Victoria in carrying out his or her official constitutional and ceremonial duties and community and international engagements. The official secretary manages the office and its administrative and service staff. All staff report to their respective managers, and through them to the Deputy Official Secretary and Official Secretary. The office also is in charge of maintaining Government House and its collections as a heritage and community asset of national importance. The official secretary is the Victorian nominee on the Council for the Order of Australia.

The Office of the Governor was established under the Public Administration Act 2004 (Vic) as an administrative office within the portfolio of the Department of Premier and Cabinet. The current official secretary is Joshua Puls and the current deputy official secretary (operations) is Taara Olorenshaw.

Australianisation of the office
As with the other states, until the 1986 Australia Acts, the office of Governor of Victoria was an appointment of the British Foreign Office although local advice was considered and sometimes accepted.

Until the appointment of Victorian-born Sir Henry Winneke in 1974, the governors of Victoria were British. Since then, governors have been Australian although several were born overseas, namely Davis McCaughey (born in Ireland) came to Australia for work and David de Kretser (born in Ceylon, now Sri Lanka) and Alex Chernov (born in Lithuania), both of whom came to Australia while at school.

List of governors of Victoria

Lieutenant-governors
Prior to the separation of the colony of Victoria from New South Wales in 1851, the area was called the Port Phillip District of New South Wales. The Governor of New South Wales appointed superintendents of the district. In 1839, Charles La Trobe was appointed superintendent. La Trobe became lieutenant-governor of the new colony of Victoria on separation on 1 July 1851.

From 1850 to 1861, the Governor of New South Wales was titled Governor-general of New South Wales in an attempt to form a federal structure. Until Victoria obtained responsible government in 1855, the Governor-general of New South Wales appointed lieutenant-governors to Victoria. On Victoria obtaining responsible government in May 1855, the title of the then incumbent lieutenant-governor, Captain Sir Charles Hotham, became governor.

Governors

Line of succession 
There is also a lieutenant-governor and an administrator. The lieutenant-governor takes on the responsibilities of the governor when that post is vacant or when the governor is out of the state or unable to act. The lieutenant-governor is appointed by the governor on the advice of the premier of Victoria. Appointment as lieutenant-governor does not of itself confer any powers or functions. If there is no governor or if the governor is unavailable to act for a substantial period, the lieutenant-governor assumes office as administrator and exercises all the powers and functions of the governor.

If expecting to be unavailable for a short period only, the governor, with the consent of the premier, usually commissions the lieutenant-governor to act as deputy for the governor, performing some or all of the powers and functions of the governor.

The chief justice of Victoria is ex officio the administrator, unless the chief justice is the lieutenant-governor, in which case the next most senior judge is the administrator. The administrator takes on the governor's duties if both the governor and lieutenant-governor are not able to act for the above reasons.

The current lieutenant-governor is James Angus, who was appointed to the role on 12 November 2021 to succeed Ken Lay.

See also 

 Governor-General of Australia
 Governors of the Australian states

References

External links 

 The Official Website of the Governor of Victoria
 Governors of Victoria, Parliament of Victoria
 Office of the Governor   Text was copied from this source, which is available under a  Creative Commons Attribution 4.0 International License.

 
Victoria
Parliament of Victoria
Victoria (Australia)-related lists
1855 establishments in Australia